In mathematics, the symmetric derivative is an operation generalizing  the ordinary derivative. It is defined as

 

The expression under the limit is sometimes called the symmetric difference quotient. A function is said to be symmetrically differentiable at a point x if its symmetric derivative exists at that point.

If a function is differentiable (in the usual sense) at a point, then it is also symmetrically differentiable, but the converse is not true. For differentiable functions, the symmetric difference quotient does provide a better numerical approximation of the derivative than the usual difference quotient.

The symmetric derivative at a given point equals the arithmetic mean of the left and right derivatives at that point, if the latter two both exist.

Neither Rolle's theorem nor the mean-value theorem hold for the symmetric derivative; some similar but weaker statements have been proved.

Examples

The absolute value function 

For the absolute value function , using the notation  for the symmetric derivative, we have at  that
 

Note that in this example both the left and right derivatives at 0 exist, but they are unequal (one is −1, while the other is +1); their average is 0, as expected.

The function x−2 

For the function , at  we have
 

Furthermore, neither the left nor the right derivative is finite at 0, i.e. this is an essential discontinuity.

The Dirichlet function 
The Dirichlet function, defined as

 

has a symmetric derivative at every , but is not symmetrically differentiable at any ; i.e. the symmetric derivative exists at rational numbers but not at irrational numbers.

Quasi-mean-value theorem 
The symmetric derivative does not obey the usual mean-value theorem (of Lagrange). As a counterexample, the symmetric derivative of  has the image {−1, 0, 1}, but secants for f can have a wider range of slopes; for instance, on the interval [−1, 2], the mean-value theorem would mandate that there exist a point where the (symmetric) derivative takes the value .

A theorem somewhat analogous to Rolle's theorem but for the symmetric derivative was established in 1967 by C. E. Aull, who named it quasi-Rolle theorem. A lemma also established by Aull as a stepping stone to this theorem states that if f is continuous on the closed interval [a, b] and symmetrically differentiable on the open interval (a, b), and additionally f(b) > f(a), then there exist a point z in (a, b) where the symmetric derivative is non-negative, or with the notation used above, fs(z) ≥ 0. Analogously, if f(b) < f(a), then there exists a point z in (a, b) where fs(z) ≤ 0.

 

As an application, the quasi-mean-value theorem for f(x) = |x| on an interval containing 0 predicts that the slope of any secant of f is between −1 and 1.

If the symmetric derivative of f has the Darboux property, then the (form of the) regular mean-value theorem (of Lagrange) holds, i.e. there exists z in (a, b) such that

 

As a consequence, if a function is continuous and its symmetric derivative is also continuous (thus has the Darboux property), then the function is differentiable in the usual sense.

Generalizations 

The notion generalizes to higher-order symmetric derivatives and also to n-dimensional Euclidean spaces.

The second symmetric derivative 
The second symmetric derivative is defined as
 

If the (usual) second derivative exists, then the second symmetric derivative exists and is equal to it. The second symmetric derivative may exist, however, even when the (ordinary) second derivative does not. As example, consider the sign function , which is defined by

 

The sign function is not continuous at zero, and therefore the second derivative for  does not exist. But the second symmetric derivative exists for :

See also 
 Central differencing scheme
 Density point
 Generalizations of the derivative
 Symmetrically continuous function

Notes

References

External links 
 
 Approximating the Derivative by the Symmetric Difference Quotient (Wolfram Demonstrations Project)

Differential calculus